The 1991 Sun Belt Conference men's basketball tournament was held March 2–4 at the Mobile Civic Center in Mobile, Alabama.

Top-seeded hosts South Alabama defeated  in the championship game, 86–81, to win their second Sun Belt men's basketball tournament. It was the Jaguars' second Sun Belt title in three years.

South Alabama, in turn, received an automatic bid to the 1991 NCAA tournament. No other Sun Belt members joined them in the tournament.

Format
There were no changes to the existing tournament format. All eight conference members were placed into the initial quarterfinal round and each team was seeded based on its regular season conference record.

Bracket

See also
Sun Belt Conference women's basketball tournament

References

Sun Belt Conference men's basketball tournament
Tournament
Sun Belt Conference men's basketball tournament
Sun Belt Conference men's basketball tournament